Powell is an unincorporated community in Edmunds County, in the U.S. state of South Dakota.

History
A post office called Powell was established in 1883, and remained in operation until 1908. The community was named for William E. Powell, a railroad official.

References

Unincorporated communities in Edmunds County, South Dakota
Unincorporated communities in South Dakota